Cosmin Lambru (born 26 November 1998) is a Romanian professional footballer who plays as a forward for CS Tunari. He played as a youngster for Petrolul Ploiești youth squad, until he was promoted to the first team. He plays with a prosthetic hand after losing his left hand in a traffic accident as a child.

Honours
Blejoi
Liga IV – Prahova County: 2018–19

External links

References

1998 births
Living people
Sportspeople from Ploiești
Romanian footballers
Association football midfielders
Liga I players
Liga II players
Liga III players
FC Petrolul Ploiești players